Altemir Gregolin (born 20 April 1964) is a veterinarian, Brazilian politician a member of the Workers Party (PT) since 1985. He served between 3 April 2006 to 1 January 2011, the end of the government of President Luiz Inácio Lula da Silva.

References

1964 births
Government ministers of Brazil
Living people
Workers' Party (Brazil) politicians